Kutiyana is a city and a municipality in Porbandar district in the Indian state of Gujarat. It is situated on the banks of Bhadar River.

History 

Source:-

The name of the town is derived from a Charan lady named Kunti, who established a nes (hamlet) at the location which grew into a village called Kuntiyana, later corrupted to Kutiyana. From a village, Kutiyana developed into a town.

Kutiyana was famous for its poets like Bhat Rao Lakhan, Sorathi Sarasvat Vaikunath, Kshatri Mardash Bhagat, Bhat Thakardas, and Bhat Bhupatsingh.

Due to its strategic importance in the medieval period being on the main road to Porbandar-Barda and on the boundaries of Ghed and hill regions, the city of Kutiyana has seen many sieges and battles in its history.

Kutiyana also came to be known as Muzafarabad by the Muslims because it is believed that Muzafar Halim, governor of Saurashtra, made it very popular and built a fort around the town. In contemporary Persian records, the town was named as such. In an inscription of Jamamasjid dated 1539 AD, it is stated that one Ibrahim Nizam Zermi build a mosque here.

In 1730-1740, Kalidas, a baniya of Ahmedabad and an official of Vasantray Purabia, built a citadel called Kalikothi in the town.

After the partition of India, displaced Hindu migrants from Pakistan were settled here in place of the Muslim population who chose to migrate to Pakistan. 

Kutiyana is interestingly also the original native place of Mahatma Gandhi, whose family held barkhali lands in the town.

Geography
It has an average elevation of 30 metres (98 feet). Kutiyana town is spread over almost a 2 km range on the banks of the Bhadar River. Kutiyana is around 42 km away from its district center, Porbandar, and 40 km away from Airport. Kutiyana taluka has 52 villages.

Demographics
 India census, Kutiyana had a population of 17,108. Males constitute 51% of the population and females 49%. Kutiyana has an average literacy rate of 63%, higher than the national average of 59.5%: male literacy is 71%, and female literacy is 54%. In Kutiyana, 13% of the population is under 6 years of age.

Transportation
Kutiyana is connected via roads. It has no train, water or airport connectivity except its nearest district center, Porbandar. Kutiyana is located on National Highway-8B, which connects all transportations enroute Rajkot to Porbandar. Main transportations are State Road Transport, private travels, passenger cars etc.

Facilities
Kutiyana town is facilitate with government hospital and some private clinics. Kutiyana is main center hub for villages to shop, eat, study and connect with other areas by road or transportation available. Kutiyana is covered with good cellular networks, which has all the service providers available in the town range. Kutiyana has got many community halls for ceremony, like Maher samaj, Ahir samaj, Soni vandi, Sindhi samaj, Mochi Samaj, Lohana-mahajan vadi, Ptel samaj etc.

Tourist attractions

Bhadar River
Pujari vav
Munivadi
Bala Hanuman Aashram (The Great Sant Shri Vishvambhardasji Maharaj)
Old Famous Village Gokran.
Kalindri Dam.

Main festivals 
Generally, falls in August or September a Grand Fair is organized for every monday of pavitra sravan month near Bhadar River coast, have food like pani puri, bhel, dabeli, roasted nuts and more.
Diwali 
Holi (festival of colours)
Ganesh Chaturthi (grand Ganesh Chaturthi is celebrated)
Makarsankranti (celebrated on 14 January every year, people fly kites, eat chikki, undhiyu and enjoy)
Navratri (traditional Garba festival of Gujarat)
Dusherra

School & colleges
raviraj Secondary and Higher Secondary school 
Education Department - 
Bala Hanuman High School,
Government High school,
S. M. Jadeja Arts & Commerce College,
ITI Kutiyana,
Taluka Shala 1 & 2,
Sharda Vidhyalay,
Namrata Primary School.
Karmayog Academy

Towns and villages
Amar
Kansabad
Katvana
Mandva
Khageshri, India

References

Cities and towns in Porbandar district